Áurea Esther "Aury" Cruz Dalmau (born January 10, 1982) is an indoor and beach volleyball player from Puerto Rico who competed for the Puerto Rico national team at the 2008 Olympic Qualification Tournament in Japan, where she was named Best Server at the event.

College career 
Cruz accepted an athletic scholarship to attend the University of Florida in Gainesville, Florida, where she competed for coach Mary Wise's Florida Gators women's volleyball team from 2000 to 2003. The Gators competed in NCAA Division I and the Southeastern Conference (SEC), and were the regular season SEC champions for four straight years during Cruz's college career.  In 2003, Cruz guided the Gators to their first-ever appearance in the NCAA championship final, where they lost to the University of Southern California (USC).  Following her 2003 senior season, she was nominated for Best Player in NCAA Division I.  She was a three-time first-team All-SEC selection, and received AVCA first-team All-American honors three consecutive years (2001, 2002, 2003).  She graduated from the university with a bachelor's degree in recreation in 2005, and was inducted into the University of Florida Athletic Hall of Fame as a "Gator Great" in 2014.

Career 
In 1999, Cruz received the Final Series Most Valuable Player award when her team from Puerto Rico, Llaneras de Toa Baja won the League Championship.  
She participated at the 2002 FIVB Volleyball Women's World Championship in Germany.
Cruz won the silver medal in the 2012 FIVB Club World Championship, playing with the Azerbaijani club Rabita Baku.

Cruz's club, Rabita Baku, won the bronze medal of the 2013–14 CEV Champions League after falling 0-3 to the Russian Dinamo Kazan in the semifinals, but defeating the Turkish Eczacıbaşı VitrA Istanbul  3-0  in the third place match.

In May 2015, the Italian club Igor Novara announced the signing of Cruz for the 2015–16 season.

Clubs 
  Llaneras de Toa Baja (1998–1999)
  Llaneras de Toa Baja (2004–2005)
  Airone Tortolì (2005–2006)
  Altamura (2006–2007)
  Ícaro Palma (2007–2008)
  Hyundai Greenfox (2008–2009)
  Llaneras de Toa Baja (2009)
  MC-Carnaghi Villa Cortese (2009–2012)
  Rabita Baku (2012–2015)
  Igor Volley Novara (2015–2016)
  Savino Del Bene Scandicci (2016–2017)

Awards

Individual 

 1999 Puerto Rican Liga de Voleibol Superior Femenino "Final Series Most Valuable Player"
 2005 NORCECA Championship "Best Receiver"
 2006 Pan-American Cup "Best Scorer"
 2006 Pan-American Cup "Best Server"
 2006 Central American and Caribbean Games "Best Receiver"
 2006 Central American and Caribbean Games "Best Scorer"
 2006/2007 Italian A-1 League All Star
 2007/2008 – For her excellent performance with Icaro Palma at "Copa de la Reina", she was chosen for the All-Star Team.
 2007 Pan-American Games "Best Receiver"
 2007 NORCECA Championship "Best Server"
 2008 Olympic Qualifier "Best Server"
 2009 Pan-American Cup "Best Scorer"
 2009 NORCECA Championship "Best Scorer"
 2010 Central American and Caribbean Games "Best Spiker"
 2010/2011 Recipient of Gazzetta Trophy, awarded by the Italian sports newspaper La Gazzetta Dello Sport
 2010/2011 Italian A-1 League "Best Receiver"
 2010/2011 Italian A-1 League "Best Scorer"
 2012/2013 Azerbaijan Super League "Best Receiver"
 2013 NORCECA Championship "Best Outside Hitter"
 2013/2014 Azerbaijan Super League "MVP", "Best Receiver", "Best Digger"
 2014 Central American and Caribbean Games "Best Outside Hitter"
 2014/2015 Azerbaijan Super League "MVP of Finals", "Best Spiker"
 2015 NORCECA Champions Cup "Best Outside Spiker"

Club 
 1999 Puerto Rican League –  Champion, with Llaneras de Toa Baja
 2007/2008 Spanish Superleague –  Runner-Up, with Icaro Palma
 2009/2010 Italian League –  Runner-Up, with MC-Carnaghi Villa Cortese
 2010/2011 Italian League –  Runner-Up, with MC-Carnaghi Villa Cortese
 2011/2012 Italian League –  Runner-Up, with MC-Carnaghi Villa Cortese
 2010 Italian Cup –  Champion, with MC-Carnaghi Villa Cortese
 2011 Italian Cup –  Champion, with MC-Carnaghi Villa Cortese
 2012 FIVB Club World Championship –  Runner-Up, with Rabita Baku
 2012–13 CEV Champions League –  Runner-Up, with Rabita Baku
 2012–13 Azerbaijan Super League –  Champion, with Rabita Baku
 2013–14 CEV Champions League –  Bronze medal, with Rabita Baku
 2013–2014 Azerbaijan Super League –  Champion, with Rabita Baku
 2014–2015 Azerbaijan Super League –  Champion, with Rabita Baku

See also 
 List of University of Florida Athletic Hall of Fame members

References

External links 
 FIVB profile
 2006 Central American and Caribbean Games official page
 Italian League profile

1982 births
Living people
Florida Gators women's volleyball players
Puerto Rican women's volleyball players
Puerto Rican expatriate sportspeople in Spain
Expatriate volleyball players in Spain
Volleyball players at the 2007 Pan American Games
Volleyball players at the 2015 Pan American Games
Pan American Games competitors for Puerto Rico
Volleyball players at the 2016 Summer Olympics
Central American and Caribbean Games silver medalists for Puerto Rico
Central American and Caribbean Games bronze medalists for Puerto Rico
Competitors at the 2006 Central American and Caribbean Games
Competitors at the 2010 Central American and Caribbean Games
Competitors at the 2014 Central American and Caribbean Games
Outside hitters
Expatriate volleyball players in Italy
Expatriate volleyball players in South Korea
Expatriate volleyball players in Azerbaijan
American expatriate sportspeople in Azerbaijan
Summer Olympics competitors for Puerto Rico
Central American and Caribbean Games medalists in volleyball